Dennis Potter (17 May 1935 – 7 June 1994) was an English dramatist with a large canon of work.

Television plays 
 1965 The Wednesday Play: The Confidence Course (no recording exists)
 1965 Alice
 1965 Almost Cinderella (not produced)
 1965 Stand Up, Nigel Barton
 1965 Vote Vote Vote for Nigel Barton
 1966 Emergency – Ward 9
 1966 Where the Buffalo Roam
 1967 Message for Posterity (no recording exists)
 1968 The Bonegrinder
 1968 Shaggy Dog
 1968 A Beast With Two Backs
 1969 Moonlight on the Highway
 1969 Son of Man 
 1970 Lay Down your Arms
 1970 Angels Are So Few 
 1971 Paper Roses
 1971 Traitor
 1972 Follow the Yellow Brick Road
 1973 Only Make Believe
 1973 A Tragedy of Two Ambitions
 1974 Joe's Ark
 1974 Schmoedipus
 1976 Double Dare
 1976 Where Adam Stood
 1979 Blue Remembered Hills
 1980 Blade on the Feather
 1980 Rain on the Roof
 1980 Cream in My Coffee
 1987 Visitors
 1987 Brimstone and Treacle (after an 11-year ban on the play, originally intended for transmission in 1976, was finally lifted)
 1994 Message for Posterity (remake of 1967 play)

Television Serials 

 1971 Casanova
 1975 Late Call
 1978 The Mayor of Casterbridge
 1978 Pennies from Heaven
 1985 Tender Is the Night
 1986 The Singing Detective
 1988 Christabel
 1989 Blackeyes (writer, director)
 1993 Lipstick on Your Collar
 1996 Karaoke
 1996 Cold Lazarus

Cinema films 

 1981 Pennies from Heaven
 1982 Brimstone and Treacle
 1983 Gorky Park
 1985 Dreamchild
 1988 Track 29 (reworking of Schmoedipus)
 1991 Secret Friends (writer, director)
 1993 Mesmer
 1993 Midnight Movie (intended for commercial release) 
 2003 The Singing Detective

Stage 

 1983 Sufficient Carbohydrate

Publications 

 The Glittering Coffin, London: Gollancz, 1960.
 The Changing Forest: Life in the Forest of Dean Today. London: Secker and Warburg, 1962.
 The Nigel Barton Plays: Stand Up, Nigel Barton, Vote Vote Vote for Nigel Barton: Two Television Plays. Harmondsworth, U.K.: Penguin, 1968.
 Son of Man (television play). London: Samuel French, 1970.
 Hide and Seek (novel). London: Deutsch, 1973.
 Brimstone and Treacle (television play). New York, Samuel French, 1978.
 Pennies from Heaven (novel). London: Quartet, 1981.
 Sufficient Carbohydrate (play). London: Faber, 1983.
 Waiting for the Boat: Dennis Potter on Television. London: Faber, 1984.
 The Singing Detective (television series). London: Faber, 1986.
 Ticket to Ride (novel). London: Faber, 1986.
 Blackeyes (novel). London: Faber, 1987.
 Christabel (television series), 1988.
 Potter on Potter, ed. by Graham Fuller. London; Boston: Faber and Faber, 1993.
 Seeing the Blossom: Two Interviews, A Lecture and A Story. London; Boston: Faber and Faber, 1994.
 Karaoke and Cold Lazarus (television plays). London: Faber, 1996.

Bibliographies by writer
Bibliographies of British writers